Azoros is a village and a community of the Elassona municipality in the Larissa regional unit. Before the 2011 local government reform it was a part of the municipality of Sarantaporo, of which it was a municipal district. The 2011 census recorded 333 inhabitants in the village. The community of Azoros covers an area of 20.308 km2.

Geography 
Azoros is built at an altitude of 520 meters at the foot of Mount Amarbeis, at a distance of 18 kilometers from Elassona, near the ruins of the ancient thessalian city of Azorus.

Near the city flows the river Titarisios, an important tributary of the Pineios. There are also natural springs in the nearby areas of Tsouknida, Tsimpitoura and Tsimpitoroula (Greek: Τσουκνίδα, Τσιμπιτούρα, Τσιμπιτορούλα).

Mount Olympus, the highest mountain in Greece, is situated about 25km Northeast of Azoros.

History 
The ancient citadel of Azoros and the walls of the Hellenistic and mid-Byzantine period are situated Southeast of the town, on the hill named "Kastri".

The area was controlled by the Byzantine Empire, until 1420 when Turahan Bey, an Ottoman military Commander, conquered the mountainous Perrhaebia.

Until 1991 the town was called Vouvala or Vuvala (Βουβάλα), but was renamed to reflect the ancient city of Azorus which is located within the community. The town was liberated by the Greek Army during the Balkan Wars and was extensively destroyed during the Axis occupation of Greece and the Greek Civil War.

Economy
The population of Azoros is occupied in animal husbandry and agriculture.

Population 
According to the 2011 census, the population of the settlement of Azoros was 333 people, a decrease of almost 33% compared with the population of the previous census of 2001.

Culture 
The main events of the village take place on January 7 (procession from the Olympiotissa monastery), July 26 (Feast of St. Paraskevi) and Clean Monday with the custom of representing a traditional wedding attract visitors to the area.

See also
 List of settlements in the Larissa regional unit

References

Populated places in Larissa (regional unit)